Anne Harris (1964 – November 17, 2022) was an American science fiction author from Michigan.

Life and work 
Harris published under three different names: her legal name, Pearl North, and Jessica Freely. 

Harris was a graduate of Ferndale High School and Oakland University, the latter with a (Bachelor of Science in computer and information science). According to her blog, she worked as a cook in a vegetarian restaurant, a freelance journalist, a public relations writer, an operations research analyst for the United States Department of Defense, and "a doggy daycare worker". Harris lived in the Detroit, Michigan area all her life; as of 2016, she was living in Royal Oak with her husband Steve.

Harris also taught in Seton Hill University's Writing Popular Fiction MFA program. Harris's literary works have been recognized and highlighted at Michigan State University in their Michigan Writers Series. She wrote under two pseudonyms. As Pearl North she published Libyrinth in 2009. It is the first volume in a young adult science fiction trilogy. The second in the series, The Boy From Ilysies, came out in November 2010, and the third, The Book of the Night, was released in 2012. Under the pen name Jessica Freely, Harris has written numerous male/male erotic romance ebooks since 2008.

Harris's second novel, Accidental Creatures, won the first Spectrum Award for a science fiction novel dealing with LGBT characters, themes and issues, published in 1998.
Her short story, "Still Life with Boobs", was a 2005 Nebula Award finalist for Best Short Story.
Her other novels include The Nature of Smoke (her first, published in 1996, shortlisted in translation for the 2007 Japanese Sense of Gender Award) and Inventing Memory, published in 2004.

Harris was "a long-term advocate of women's rights, reproductive freedom, and LGBT rights."

References

External links 
Her websites are jessicafreely.com and anneharris.net
https://web.archive.org/web/20101114150527/http://www.setonhill.edu/academics/fiction/
Walsh, Therese. "AUTHOR INTERVIEW: Anne Harris" Writer Unboxed August 11th, 2006
"Still Life with Boobs" online

1964 births
2022 deaths
20th-century American novelists
21st-century American novelists
American fantasy writers
American science fiction writers
American women short story writers
American women novelists
Nebula Award winners
Writers from Detroit
Oakland University alumni
Seton Hill University
Women science fiction and fantasy writers
20th-century American women writers
21st-century American women writers
20th-century American short story writers
21st-century American short story writers
Novelists from Michigan